Palabishegham is a 1977 Indian Tamil-language film written and directed by K. S. Gopalakrishnan. The film stars Jaishankar, Srikanth, Sripriya and Rajasulochana. It was released on 14 May 1977.

Plot 

Kumaran is a hard working farmer living a simple life along with his mother Meenakshi. In reality, Meenakshi is the wife of the village landlord, who lives with his concubine Sengamalam and a son named Muthaiah. Kumaran despises Muthaiah and they lock horns to win the love of Sivagami. Sivagami chooses to marry Kumaran, but her father "Poisatchi" Boothalingam does not approve. So Sivagamai escapes her home and marries Kumaran. Muthaiah and his mother plot to destroy Kumaran. Also Sengamalam hatches a secret plan along with Boothalingam to take over the landlord's property.

Sengamalam is seen in a compromising position with Boothalingam by Muthaiah, who now understands the true intentions of his mother. Sengamalam's plan is to kill the landlord by giving milk laced with poison and make it look like suicide, for which she writes a letter to the police by imitating the landlord's signature. This plan is overheard by Muthaiah, who informs Kumaran and his mother to help save their father and also asks for an apology to Kumaran. Now Kumaran and Muthaiah unite to thwart the plan and save the landlord, who realises his mistake and regrets his misdeeds and apologises to his wife Meenakshi and Kumaran and unites with his first family.

Cast 
 Jaishankar as Kumaran
 Srikanth as Muthaiah
 Sripriya as Sivakami
 S. A. Ashokan as the Landlord
 Pandari Bai as Meenakshi
 Rajasulochana as Sengamalam
 Thengai Srinivasan as "Poisatchi" Bhuthalingam
 Suruli Rajan
 T. K. S. Natarajan
 Samikannu
 Typist Gopu
 Thideer Kanniyah
 ISR as Kanakku

Soundtrack 
Music was composed by Shankar–Ganesh and lyrics were written by Vaali and A. Maruthakasi.

References

External links 
 

1970s Tamil-language films
1977 films
Films directed by K. S. Gopalakrishnan
Films scored by Shankar–Ganesh
Films with screenplays by K. S. Gopalakrishnan
Indian black-and-white films